Bunyoro sub-region is a region in Western Uganda that consists of the following districts:

 Buliisa District
 Hoima District
 Kibaale District
 Kiryandongo District
 Masindi District

The area covered by the above districts is coterminous with the traditional Bunyoro Kingdom. Milton Obote abolished the traditional kingdoms in Uganda in 1967. When Yoweri Museveni re-established them in 1993, Bunyoro re-constituted itself.

The sub-region is home mainly to the Banyoro ethnic group. The people of Bunyoro are called Banyoro (singular: Munyoro). The Banyoro speak Runyoro, a Bantu language. Runyoro closely related to Rutooro, spoken by the people of the neighboring Toro sub-region. The language is often referred to as Runyoro/Rutooro.

According to the 2002 national census, the Bunyoro sub-region was home to an estimated 0.75 million people at that time.

See also
 Regions of Uganda
 Districts of Uganda

References

 
Sub-regions of Uganda
Western Region, Uganda